Sergio Matías Oga (born 15 September 1981) is an Argentine professional footballer who plays as a midfielder for Gimnasia y Esgrima.

Career
General Paz Juniors were Oga's second team, they signed him from Club Atlético Las Flores. He featured for the Torneo Argentino A side eighty-six times whilst netting seventeen goals. In 2006, San Martín of Primera B Nacional completed the signing of Oga. He scored one goal for them across the 2006–07 campaign, which preceded him departing to join Central Córdoba in 2007. Six goals in twenty-nine matches followed in Torneo Argentino B, with them winning promotion to tier three. Having netted eight times in the subsequent Torneo Argentino A campaign, Oga left to sign for Central Norte in 2009.

Oga spent a total of four seasons with Central Norte in Torneo Argentino B and Torneo Argentino A, though one of which was spent out on loan with Sportivo Desamparados for the 2011–12 Primera B Nacional. He scored and was sent off in his final match for Sportivo Desamparados on 23 June 2012, receiving a second yellow card seconds after netting the winner in a 3–2 victory over Rosario Central on the final day as relegation was confirmed. On 26 July 2013, Oga returned to tier four by agreeing a move to Gimnasia y Esgrima. The club then won consecutive promotions up to Primera B Nacional.

Gimnasia y Esgrima were relegated at the end of 2015, though Oga ended it with twenty-eight appearances and goals versus Los Andes, Boca Unidos and Villa Dálmine. He departed on 20 January 2016 for a short stint back with Central Norte - where he took his overall tally for the club to nineteen goals in one hundred and four encounters - prior to rejoining Gimnasia y Esgrima in June. Oga won promotion for the fourth time in his career at the conclusion of 2017–18, after they eliminated Defensores de Belgrano in the promotion play-off finals.

Career statistics
.

Honours
Gimnasia y Esgrima
Torneo Argentino B: 2013–14

References

External links

1981 births
Living people
Footballers from Córdoba, Argentina
Argentine footballers
Association football midfielders
Torneo Argentino A players
Primera Nacional players
Torneo Argentino B players
Torneo Federal A players
General Paz Juniors footballers
San Martín de Tucumán footballers
Central Córdoba de Santiago del Estero footballers
Central Norte players
Sportivo Desamparados footballers
Gimnasia y Esgrima de Mendoza footballers
21st-century Argentine people